Archiearis notha, the light orange underwing, is a moth of the family Geometridae. The species was first described by Jacob Hübner in 1803 and can be found in Europe.

The wingspan is about 35 mm. The moths fly from March to April depending on the location.

The larvae feed on aspen (Populus tremula), hiding between spun leaves during the day.

References

External links

Kimmo's Lep Site
Boudinotiana notha at Moths and Butterflies of Europe and North Africa

Lepiforum e.V.
Portal für Schmetterlinge und Raupen

Archiearinae
Moths of Europe
Taxa named by Jacob Hübner
Moths described in 1803